Russ Rymer (born May 17, 1952) is an American author and freelance journalist who has contributed articles to the New York Times, the Los Angeles Times, The New Yorker, National Geographic, Harper's, Smithsonian, Vogue, and Los Angeles Magazine, among other publications. His first book, Genie, a Scientific Tragedy (HarperCollins, 1993), was a finalist for the National Book Critics Circle Award and won a Whiting Award. It was translated into six languages and transformed into a NOVA television documentary. His second book, about the American Beach community in Florida, was American Beach: a Saga of Race, Wealth, and Memory (HarperCollins, 1998, re-subtitled American Beach: How "Progress" Robbed a Black Town--and Nation--of History, Wealth, and Power for the paperback edition). His third book and first novel, Paris Twilight, was published by Houghton Mifflin Harcourt in 2013.

In 2005, Russ Rymer became the editor-in-chief for Mother Jones, although he held this position for only one year. From 2011 to '13 Rymer was the Joan Leiman Jacobson Non-Fiction Writer in Residence at Smith College. He was the 2009-10 Carl and Lily Pforzheimer Foundation Fellow at the Radcliffe Institute for Advanced Study at Harvard University. He has been a lecturer in Writing and Humanistic Studies and at the Graduate Program in Science Writing at MIT, a visiting professor at the University of California at Berkeley's Graduate School of Journalism, instructor at the California Institute of Technology, and Distinguished Writer in Residence at St. Mary's College in Moraga, California.

The John Simon Guggenheim Memorial Foundation appointed Rymer a Guggenheim Fellow in 2002. In 2012 he was awarded the Ed Cunningham Award for best magazine reporting from abroad by the Overseas Press Club  for his National Geographic report on the disappearance of languages. He is married to the writer Susan Faludi.

See also
Genie (feral child)

References

External links 
Profile at The Whiting Foundation

Living people
1952 births